Sir Richard Green-Price, 1st Baronet (18 October 1803 – 11 August 1887), was a Welsh Liberal politician.

Born Richard Green, he assumed the additional surname of Price as heir to his maternal uncle Richard Price of Norton Manor, Radnorshire. He was returned to Parliament for Radnor in 1863, a seat he held until 1869, and later represented Radnorshire between 1880 and 1885. In 1874 he was created a baronet, of Norton Manor in the parish of Norton in the County of Radnor and in 1876 served as High Sheriff of Radnorshire.

Green-Price died in August 1887, aged 83. He is commemorated by a Grade-II-listed red granite obelisk near Hengwm Hill north-west of Norton.

References

Kidd, Charles, Williamson, David (editors). Debrett's Peerage and Baronetage (1990 edition). New York: St Martin's Press, 1990.

1803 births
1887 deaths
Baronets in the Baronetage of the United Kingdom
High Sheriffs of Radnorshire
Liberal Party (UK) MPs for Welsh constituencies
UK MPs 1859–1865
UK MPs 1865–1868
UK MPs 1868–1874
UK MPs 1880–1885